T Nallamuthu Ramamurthi was an Indian politician and academic. She was a Member of Parliament, representing Madras State in the Rajya Sabha the upper house of India's Parliament as a member of the Indian National Congress. She was the first Indian Principal of  Queen Mary's College, Chennai in 1946 replacing Miss Myers.

References

Rajya Sabha members from Tamil Nadu
Indian National Congress politicians
1896 births
1972 deaths
Indian National Congress politicians from Tamil Nadu